Papiliovenator (meaning "butterfly hunter", after a butterfly-shaped feature on its first two dorsal vertebrae) is a genus of troodontid theropod dinosaur from the Bayan Mandahu Formation of Inner Mongolia, China. The type and only species is Papiliovenator neimengguensis.

Description 

The holotype, BNMNH-PV030, is a partial, semi-articulated subadult skeleton consisting of a nearly complete cranium and other postcranial bones. Uniquely, its snout was short and subtriangular, more similar to that of Early Cretaceous troodontids such as Mei long than the long, low snouts of Late Cretaceous troodontids. This and other unique traits of irs skeleton suggest a high diversity of troodontid morphotypes in the Late Cretaceous Gobi Desert.

Classification 
Pei et al. recover Papiliovenator as the earliest-diverging member of a clade consisting of all Late Cretaceous troodontids except for Almas ukhaa.

References 

Troodontids
Fossil taxa described in 2021